The Penske PC-7 is a CART open-wheel race car, designed by British designer Geoff Ferris at Penske Racing, which was constructed for competition in the 1979 season.

References

Racing cars
American Championship racing cars